Alexei A. Andreyuk  (born 1959, in Brest, Belarus), studied architecture at the Civil Engineering Institute in Brest, a member of the Belarusian Academy of Architecture, the chairman of the Brest Regional Department of the Belarusian Union of Architects, the manager of architectural workshop “Studio A-3”, a lecturer at the Brest State Technical University. A participant and prizewinner of numerous design contests in Belarus and abroad. Most of his designs are devoted to his native Brest. The concept of Brest Master Plan is based on his historical urban survey of the city.

External links 
 an article (in Russian) in "Vecherniy Brest" 
 an article (in Russian) in "Vecherniy Brest"

1959 births
Belarusian architects
Living people
People from Brest, Belarus
Date of birth missing (living people)